This article concerns the systems of telecommunication in Austria. Austria has a highly developed and efficient telephone network, and has a number of radio and television broadcast stations.

Infrastructure

The telephone system is highly developed and efficient. Fibre-optic coverage is extensive, although it remains very expensive. A full range of telephone and Internet services are available via the network.

Austria has 15 satellite earth stations, two Intelsat (one Atlantic Ocean and one Indian Ocean) and one Eutelsat.  Additionally, there are around 600 very-small-aperture terminals (VSATs) (2007).

Telephones

 International calling code: 43

Fixed line phones
 3.4 million fixed line phones, 47th in the world (2011).

The majority of fixed lines are analogue, with Integrated Services Digital Network (ISDN) lines for the remainder.

Fixed-line subscribership has been in decline since the mid-1990s and was eclipsed by mobile-cellular in the late 1990s.

Mobile phones
 7.6 million mobile phone lines in use, 60th in the world (2011).

The Austrian mobile phone market is highly competitive, with some of the lowest rates in Europe. Due to the geographical structures of Austria (mountains, flat lands, lakes) many providers use it as a "testing range" for new services. Mobile number portability was introduced in 2008, allowing users to retain their mobile phone numbers when switching between network operators. The original area codes allocated to each operator can no longer be used to determine the network with which a subscriber is registered.

First generation networks
 D-Netz by Telekom Austria. This network was switched off at the end of the 1990s.

Second generation networks
There are three nationwide GSM networks which also support additional brands and mobile virtual network operators (MVNOs).
 A1: originally Mobilkom. It now runs a mixed GSM-900, GSM-1800 and UMTS network. Also provides service for MVNO's bob, B-free (owned by A1), Red Bull Mobile and Yess! 
 T-Mobile: originally max mobil. It now runs a mixed GSM-900, GSM-1800 and UMTS network. Also marketed as telering as a separate brand.
 Orange: originally One (until September 2008). A mixed GSM-1800 and UMTS network. Since end 2011 owned by Drei/Hutchinson Whampoa.

Third generation networks
 Drei: Owned by Hutchinson Whampoa, a Hong Kong based company that runs its own UMTS network.

Internet
 37 Internet service providers (ISPs), most of them organised in the local ISP association Internet Service Providers Austria, ISPA.
 6.7 million Internet users, 50th in the world; 81% of the population, 29th in the world (2012).
 2,074,252 fixed broadband subscriptions, 41st in the world; 25.2% of the population, 33rd in the world (2012). 	
 4,564,834 mobile subscriptions, 40th in the world; 55.5% of the population, 23rd in the world (2012).
 3.5 million Internet hosts, 30th in the world (2012).
 300,000 Asymmetric Digital Subscriber Lines (ADSL).

The country code for Austria is "AT", the country code top level domain (ccTLD) is ".at".

".wien" is a top level domain for sites with a connection to the Austrian capital WIEN (Vienna, Austria).

The Austrian broadband market is dominated by the DSL providers, which rapidly overtook cable as the preferred access method. However, mobile services employing UMTS/HSDPA and LTE are rapidly gaining ground due to fierce market competition. SDSL and optical fiber access is also available.

The main ISP's in Austria are: 
 Telekom Austria (incumbent) 
 UPC, bought by T-Mobile Austria in 2018.
 Tele2, acquired by mobile operator Hutchison Drei Austria also in 2018.
 kabelPlus, offering cable services in the area around Vienna and
 next layer, offering fiber and data center services to business customers only.

Typical speeds are up to 30Mbit/s download and 5Mbit/s upload over DSL (up to 50Mbit/s download over VDSL), and up to 250Mbit/s download and 25Mbit/s upload over cable.

There are also a number of smaller locally centered ISPs typically providing services in a city, district, or state over their own infrastructure. Most are also able to deliver services Austria wide by using resold Telekom Austria lines/capacity with value added services such as static IP addresses and IPv6. Notable are: 
 Hotze.com in Tyrol 
 Liwest in Upper Austria, 
 Salzburg AG in the state of Salzburg.

Some ISPs offer up to 250Mbit speed over DOCSIS 3.0 or FTTH: 
 UPC Fiber Power (in most bigger cities Austria wide, up to 250Mbit/s download and 25Mbit/s upload) over a FTTB variation with coaxial cable as in-house cabling / Blizznet (in some districts of Vienna, up to 100Mbit download and 100Mbit upload) as Fiber to the Home (FTTH).
 Business/Datacenter Internet connections and carrier up links with speeds up to 100Gbit/s as well as wavelength and dark fiber services for data transport in and between cities are available as well, with the main connection point being Vienna, where most carriers have one or more POPs in their own or carrier neutral datacenters.

Flat rate plans are the most common for fixed broadband service. Some cable and DSL contracts offer price reductions for university students. A data transfer limit does not apply for most plans.

Some ISPs offer flat rates for mobile access. Data transfer limits apply to most mobile broadband access which is usually shaped to a certain speed after the data transfer limit is reached.

Internet censorship and surveillance
In August 2014, IFPI Austria has requested Internet blocking for several file sharing web sites such as The Pirate Bay and isoHunt, starting the latest August 14, 2014 (postponed from August 1, 2014). This procedure has been heavily criticized in the media, as there is no formal procedure for unblocking such IPs ever again, and no formal review process that incorrect blocks cannot be obtained. Users sharing an IP may be blocked as a side effect, too.

, Austrian ISPs are now once again free to unblock all previously blocked sites after the government appealed a new law for file sharing similar to the one in Switzerland. Although the IFPI is still trying to challenge this ruling.

There are no government restrictions on access to the Internet or credible reports that the government monitors e-mail or Internet chat rooms without appropriate legal authority. Individuals and groups engage in the peaceful expression of views via the Internet, including by e-mail. Authorities work to restrict access to Web sites containing information that violates the law, such as neo-Nazi and child pornography sites. Authorities restrict access to banned Web sites by trying to shut such sites and forbidding the country's Internet service providers to carry them.

The Austrian constitution provides for freedom of speech and press, and the government generally respects these rights in practice. An independent press, an effective judiciary, and a functioning democratic political system combine to ensure freedom of speech and the press. The independent media are active and express a wide variety of views with few restrictions. Individuals generally criticize the government publicly or privately without reprisal. The law prohibits arbitrary interference with privacy, family, home, or correspondence, and the government generally respects these prohibitions in practice.

The law prohibits incitement, insult, or contempt against a group because of its members’ race, nationality, or ethnicity if the statement violates human dignity and the government strictly enforces these laws. The law prohibits public denial, belittlement, approval, or justification of the Nazi genocide or other Nazi crimes against humanity in a print publication, a broadcast, or other media and the government strictly enforces these laws. Strict libel and slander laws discourage reporting of governmental abuse. For example, many observers believed that the ability and willingness of the police to sue for libel or slander discourages individuals from reporting abuse by police.

On 31 July 2012, a 26-year-old man received an 18-month sentence, of which 12 months were to be served, for posting that his favorite book was Hitler’s Mein Kampf and linking to Nazi material on his Facebook page.

In February 2007 Austrian authorities were able to uncover a "child-pornography ring" involving seventy-seven countries, based on a report by a man working for a Vienna-based Internet file-hosting service.

As of March 2022 the websites of RT have been blocked by the major Internet service providers.

In August 2022, ISPs were ordered to block further domains, as well as individual IP addresses belonging to CDN providers. The latter rendered a large number of websites to become unavailable.

Radio and television

 There are 2 AM, 160 FM and 1 shortwave radio broadcast stations, with several hundred FM repeaters.  
 There were 6.08 million radios in Austria in 1997.  
 There are 45 broadcast television stations, with in excess of 1000 repeaters.  
 There were 4.25 million televisions in the country in 1997.

The largest broadcasting corporations are:
 Österreichischer Rundfunk (ORF), Austria's public broadcaster, was the main broadcast source until commercial radio and TV service was introduced in the 1990s.  
 ATV, privately held
 Puls 4, privately held
 Servus TV, privately held

See also
 Alpes Adria Internet Exchange (AAIX), a non-profit exchange located in Klagenfurt, Austria.
 Area codes in Austria
 Freinberg Transmitter
 List of radio stations in Austria and Liechtenstein
 Telephone numbers in Austria

References

External links
 
 Alpes Adria Internet Exchange website

 
Internet in Austria